Troutville is a borough in Clearfield County, Pennsylvania, United States. The population was 230 at the 2020 census.

Geography
Troutville is located near the western border of Clearfield County at  (41.023829, -78.787111). Pennsylvania Route 410 passes through the borough, leading east  to Luthersburg and southwest  to U.S. Route 119 near Big Run.

Demographics

As of the census of 2000, there were 224 people, 82 households, and 65 families residing in the borough. The population density was 286.1 people per square mile (110.9/km2). There were 86 housing units at an average density of 109.8 per square mile (42.6/km2). The racial makeup of the borough was 98.66% White, and 1.34% from two or more races.

There were 82 households, out of which 39.0% had children under the age of 18 living with them, 62.2% were married couples living together, 14.6% had a female householder with no husband present, and 20.7% were non-families. 18.3% of all households were made up of individuals, and 11.0% had someone living alone who was 65 years of age or older. The average household size was 2.73 and the average family size was 3.15.

In the borough the population was spread out, with 28.1% under the age of 18, 8.5% from 18 to 24, 26.3% from 25 to 44, 21.9% from 45 to 64, and 15.2% who were 65 years of age or older. The median age was 38 years. For every 100 females there were 86.7 males. For every 100 females age 18 and over, there were 80.9 males.

The median income for a household in the borough was $32,813, and the median income for a family was $37,188. Males had a median income of $29,375 versus $20,000 for females. The per capita income for the borough was $15,335. About 3.3% of families and 7.1% of the population were below the poverty line, including none of those under the age of eighteen or sixty five or over.

References

Boroughs in Clearfield County, Pennsylvania
1890 establishments in Pennsylvania